Ximena Restrepo Gaviria (born March 10, 1969 in Medellín) is a former Colombian nationalized Chilean sprinter who specialised in the 400 metres.

With the time of 49.64 seconds she won a bronze medal in 400 metres at the 1992 Olympic Games, Colombia's first athletics medal. This result is still a South American record, as is the case with her 200 metres time of 22.92 seconds, which she achieved in 1991. At the 1991 Pan American Games she won silver medals in 200 and 400 metres.

Restrepo is married to Chilean shot putter Gert Weil. She attended the University of Nebraska, where she won the 1991 NCAA Championship in the 400 meters. Martina Weil, daughter of Ximena and Gert, is a track and field athlete at the University of Tennessee after winning the 400 meters in the South American U23 championships and setting a Chilean national record in the event.

Living now in Chile, she is the first ever female elected vice-president of the International Association of Athletics Federations, in Doha on 25 September 2019.

International competitions

1Did not start in the semifinals
2Representing the Americas

References

External links

1969 births
Living people
Sportspeople from Medellín
Colombian female sprinters
Olympic athletes of Colombia
Olympic bronze medalists for Colombia
Athletes (track and field) at the 1988 Summer Olympics
Athletes (track and field) at the 1992 Summer Olympics
Athletes (track and field) at the 1996 Summer Olympics
Athletes (track and field) at the 2000 Summer Olympics
Pan American Games medalists in athletics (track and field)
Athletes (track and field) at the 1991 Pan American Games
Athletes (track and field) at the 1995 Pan American Games
World Athletics Championships athletes for Colombia
Medalists at the 1992 Summer Olympics
Pan American Games silver medalists for Colombia
Olympic bronze medalists in athletics (track and field)
South American Games gold medalists for Colombia
South American Games medalists in athletics
Competitors at the 1994 South American Games
Central American and Caribbean Games bronze medalists for Colombia
Competitors at the 1993 Central American and Caribbean Games
Central American and Caribbean Games medalists in athletics
Medalists at the 1991 Pan American Games
Olympic female sprinters
20th-century Colombian women